47th may refer to:

Chicago Transit Authority stations 
 47th station (CTA Green Line), on the Green Line
 47th station (CTA Red Line), on the Red Line

See also